The California grizzly bear (Ursus arctos californicus) is an extinct population or subspecies of the brown bear, generally known (together with other North American brown bear populations) as the grizzly bear. "Grizzly" could have meant "grizzled" that is, with golden and grey tips of the hair or "fear-inspiring" (as a phonetic spelling of "grisly"). Nonetheless, after careful study, naturalist George Ord formally classified it in 1815 – not for its hair, but for its character – as Ursus horribilis ("terrifying bear"). Genetically, North American brown bears are closely related; in size and coloring, the California grizzly bear was much like the Kodiak bear of the southern coast of Alaska. In California, it was particularly admired for its beauty, size, and strength. The grizzly became a symbol of the Bear Flag Republic, a moniker that was attached to the short-lived attempt by a group of U.S. settlers to break away from Mexico in 1846. Later, this rebel flag became the basis for the state flag of California, and then California was known as the "Bear State".

Taxonomy 
A 1953 researcher stated, "The specific status of North American brown bears (or grizzly bears) is one of the most complex problems of mammalian taxonomy. The difficulty stems directly from the work of Merriam (1918), who concluded that there are 86 forms of grizzlies (and brown bears) in North America."

North American brown bears were taxonomically grouped as a species apart from other bear species, until DNA testing revealed that they should properly be grouped in the same species as the other brown bears. Grizzlies living in California had been classified by Merriam into many subspecies, but the only genetically anomalous grouping in North America is the ABC Islands bears.

Distribution and habitat 

Prior to Spanish settlement in the second half of the 1700s, it is estimated that 10,000 grizzly bears inhabited what is modern-day California. It is thought that the bears lived across almost the entirety of the state, save its most southeastern and northeastern corners. Probably the southernmost records for this subspecies are from the Sierra de Juárez, during the 18th century. The bears ate a diverse diet from California's varied climates, ranging from plant sources like grasses, seeds, and berries, and acorns, to animal sources such as deer, salmon, steelhead, and carrionincluding beached whale carcasses.

Relationship with humans

European contact 

Europeans' first recorded encounters with California grizzly bears are found in diaries kept by several members of the 1769 Portola expedition, the first European land exploration of what is now the state of California. Several place names that include the Spanish word for bear (oso) trace their origins back to that first overland expedition (e.g. Los Osos). As the settled frontier of New Spain was extended northward, settlers began to populate California and establish large cattle herds as the main industry. The ranchers' domesticated livestock were easy prey for the grizzly bears roaming freely across the state. By eating their livelihood and scaring them, the grizzlies became enemies of the rancheros. Vaqueros hunted the grizzlies, often roping and capturing them to be pitted against other animals in public battles.

The California grizzly was an enormous bear. Father Pedro Font, an early missionary, described the local grizzly bears, writing, "He was horrible, fierce, large, and fat." The incident was recalled in 1932 by Catherine E. Lovett Smith, who witnessed the bear's killing on her family's ranch when she was six years old. If its measurements are accurate, this particular bear was the biggest bear ever found in California and, indeed, one of the largest specimens of any bear species ever recorded. (Other sources confirm Lovett Smith's account of the bear, but differ as to its exact size.) Her telling of that bear is part of the oral history of "Bear Valley", the original name for Valley Center. The bear ranged as far south as the Big Sur region of central California. Frank Post, born in 1859 on the Soberanes Ranch in Big Sur, remembered when his family lived at Soberanes Creek, during the American Civil War – and the "Great Sur Bears".

Extinction 

In the late 1700s, Spanish ranchers placed a poisoned "bait ball" made of suet or swine entrails filled with a lethal dose of strychnine which they hung from the branches of a tree within reach of the bear but out of reach of dogs and children. Mexican settlers captured bears for bear and bull fights and they also sold their skins for 6 to 10 pesos to trading ships. Bear Trap Canyon near Bixby Creek was one of their favorite sites for trapping grizzly bears along the central California coast.

Bear-baiting events flourished as popular spectacles in 19th century California. Bloody fights that pitted bears against bulls often inspired betting as to whether the bear or the bull would win. One persistently popular, but false phrase origin story related to these fights stems from famous 19th-century newspaperman Horace Greeley. While visiting California Greeley allegedly witnessed such a fight, and supposedly gave the modern stock market its "bear" and "bull" nicknames based on the fighting styles of the two animals: the bear swipes downward while the bull hooks upward. In truth, the phrase's origins predate Greeley's 1859 journey to California by at least 100 years, but the myth of the California connection persists.

The Monterey County Herald noted on July 4, 1874:

European settlers paid bounties on the bears who regularly preyed on livestock until the early 20th century. Absolom (Rocky) Beasley hunted grizzly bears throughout the Santa Lucia Mountains and claimed to have killed 139 bears in his lifetime. Noted California mountain man Seth Kinman claimed to have shot over 800 grizzly bears in a 20 year period in the areas surrounding present day Humboldt County. One prospector in Southern California, William F. Holcomb (nicknamed "Grizzly Bill" Holcomb), was particularly well known for hunting grizzly bears in what is now San Bernardino County.
During September 1897, in the mountains between Inwood and Mt. Lassen, Shasta County,  21-year-old Elias Weigart and his dog encountered a huge California grizzly whose front track measured 11 inches and the rear, 19. The bear died after Weigart emptied his Winchester 38-55 into the beast at close range.

The last hunted California grizzly bear was shot in Tulare County, California, in August 1922, although no body, skeleton or pelt was ever produced. Less than 75 years after the discovery of gold in 1848, almost every grizzly bear in California had been tracked down and killed. In 1924, what was thought to be a grizzly was spotted in Sequoia National Park for the last time and thereafter, grizzlies were never seen again in California.

Reintroduction 
California still has habitat that can sustain about 500 grizzlies. In 2014, the U.S. Fish and Wildlife Service received and rejected a petition to reintroduce grizzly bears to California. In 2015, the Center for Biological Diversity launched a petition aimed at the California state legislature to reintroduce the grizzly bear to the state.  The California grizzly bear has been considered as a possible candidate for attempts at de-extinction, through the proposed use of back-breeding, cloning and genetic engineering to recreate extinct species.

Symbolism 

The California grizzly bear is one of the state's most visible and enduring symbols, adorning both the state flag and seal. The Bear Flag first flew in 1846 as a symbol of the short-lived California Republic. A second version was adopted as the state flag by the state legislature in 1911. The bear symbol became a permanent part of the state seal in 1849. The California grizzly bear was designated the official state animal in 1953. The bear is celebrated in name and as mascot of the sports teams of the University of California, Berkeley (the California Golden Bears), and of the University of California, Los Angeles (the UCLA Bruins) and in the mascot of University of California, Riverside (Scottie the Bear, dressed in a Highland kilt). The California Maritime Academy operates a training ship named Golden Bear.

References

Further reading

External links 

Grizzly bears
Endemic fauna of California
Extinct bears
Carnivorans of North America
Mammals of the United States
Mammal extinctions since 1500
Extinct animals of the United States
Species made extinct by human activities
Grizzly California
Mammals described in 1896
Taxa named by Clinton Hart Merriam